Bartschella is a genus of small sea snails, marine gastropod mollusks in the family Pyramidellidae, the pyrams and their allies.

Species
 Bartschella subangulata (Carpenter, 1857)

References

External links
 World Register of Marine Species

Pyramidellidae